This is a list of the Oxford University crews who have competed in The Boat Race since its inception in 1829.  A coxswain or oarsman earns their rowing Blue by rowing in the Boat Race.

Rowers are listed left to right in boat position from bow to stroke. The number following the rower indicates the rower's weight in stones and pounds.

1828–1854

1856–1877

1878–1899

1900–1914

1920–1939

1940–1945 unofficial wartime races

1946–1970

1971–1999

2000 onwards

 The 2020 Boat Race was cancelled due to the COVID-19 pandemic after the crew were announced.

See also
List of Cambridge University Boat Race crews
List of Oxford University Isis crews
Grand Challenge Cup

References

OUBC Crew Lists – from 2000 to present
The Oxford and Cambridge Boat Race website – from 2002 to present, with biographies
British Rowing Almanack – from 1861 to present

William Fisher MacMichael, The Oxford and Cambridge Boat Races: From A.D. 1829 to 1869, Publisher: Deighton, 1870, 380 pages

 |Boat Race crews
Boat Race, Oxford University crews
Boat Race, Oxford University crews
Boat Race crews
Boat Race crews
Boat Race, Oxford University crews
Boat Race, Oxford University crews